Maypearl is a city in Ellis County, Texas, United States. The population was 939 in 2020.

Geography

Maypearl is located in western Ellis County at  (32.315701, –97.006839).

The climate in this area is characterized by hot, humid summers and generally mild to cool winters. According to the Köppen Climate Classification system, Maypearl has a humid subtropical climate, abbreviated "Cfa" on climate maps.

Demographics

As of the 2020 United States census, there were 939 people, 351 households, and 248 families residing in the city.

Education
The community is served by the Maypearl Independent School District and is home to the Maypearl High School Panthers. The district received a recognized status by the Texas Education Agency for the 2009–2010 academic year

References

External links
City of Maypearl official website

Dallas–Fort Worth metroplex
Cities in Texas
Cities in Ellis County, Texas
Populated places established in 1910
1910 establishments in Texas